Dunno Y ... Na Jaane Kyon is a 2010 bilingual Indian film. It was directed by Sanjay Sharma and written by his brother Kapil Sharma who also played the lead. It premiered in April 2010 at India's first mainstream gay film festival, the Kashish Mumbai International Queer Film Festival. It features the first gay kiss in Indian cinema between Yuvraaj Parashar and Kapil Sharma.

The film had its North American premiere at the I View Film Festival in New York City and was screened at the Sydney Film Festival, the Indian Film Festival of London (IFFL) and Filmfest homochrom in Germany. Dunno Y... Na Jaane Kyon was released in theatres in Austria, Italy and Switzerland in September 2010.

The film received the Best Sensitive Award at the Kashish Queer International film festival 2010 and the Viewer Choice Award at the Satrang Film Festival of Sydney 2010. It also won the Best Film awards at Poland Film Festival 2014, Napless Italy 2014, and the Nasik International Film Festival 2014. Lead actors Yuvraaj Parashar and Kapil Sharma won Best Actor awards at Out View Film Festival Greece 2012. The film got screened at 17 international film festivals. A sequel has also been made starring Zeenat Aman, Kapil Sharma and Yuvraaj Parashar.

Cast

 Zeenat Aman as Nazneen Ali Mirza
 Kapil Sharma as Aryan
 Kabir Bedi
 Hazel Croney
 Helen
 Mahabanoo Mody-Kotwal
 Yuvraaj Parashar as Ashley
 Asha Sachdev
 Parikshat Sahni
 Rituparna Sengupta
 Aryan Vaid

Music
The film's music is composed by Nikhil Kamat. The theme song "Pal Mein Rishte Badal Jaate Hain" is performed by Lata Mangeshkar. The film also features Zeenat Aman performing the song "Aap Jaisa Koi" from her film Qurbani and the song "Chura Liya Hai Tumne" from Yaadon Ki Baraat.

"Atariyan Main" - Rekha Rao
"Dabi Dabi Khwahishein" (duet) - Shaan and Shreya Ghoshal
"Dabi Dabi Khwahishein (male)" - Shaan
"Dabi Dabi Khwahishein (version 2)" - Shaan, Farhad Bhiwandiwala and Shreya Ghoshal
"Dunno Y Na Jaane Kyon (male)" - Shaan
"Dunno Y Na Jaane Kyon (female)" - Lata Mangeshkar 
"Helen Theme" - N/A
"Jenny/Ashley in Love" - N/A
"Saiyan Saiyan" - Farhad Bhiwandiwala, Nikhil
"Mumbai Meri Hain" - Anee Chatterjee 
"Zeenat Aman (sad theme)" - N/A

Controversy
The real life parents of Yuvraaj Parashar, one of two lead characters,  have initiated legal action to disown him because of the shame arising from the film, claiming to "not want to see his face even in death". This came despite Parashar winning acclaim from Deputy Chief Minister of Maharashtra Chhagan Bhujbal for his sensitive portrayal of gay men.

Furthermore, the lovemaking scene between Parashar and Kapil Sharma is facing censorship. Sharma said: "Why should the censors be scandalised if two men are kissing and making love?  The ones in my film are very aesthetic. And so what if it’s two men making love? Love is love regardless of gender."

References

External links
 
 Bollywood director confident gay kiss will pass censors - BBC

2010 films
2010s Hindi-language films
2010 LGBT-related films
2010s buddy drama films
Gay-related films
Indian buddy drama films
Indian LGBT-related films
LGBT-related buddy drama films
2010 multilingual films
Indian multilingual films